Ctenocolletacarus is a genus of mites in the family Acaridae.

Species
 Ctenocolletacarus brevirostris Fain, 1984
 Ctenocolletacarus grandior Fain, 1984
 Ctenocolletacarus longirostris Fain, 1984

References

Acaridae